Machong, sometimes mispronounced Mayong, is a town under the jurisdiction of the prefecture-level city of Dongguan in the Pearl River Delta region of Guangdong Province, China. It is located at the northwest corner of Dongguan's administration and is the city's westernmost division.

External links
 Town government website

Geography of Dongguan
Towns in Guangdong